Obedi Mwanga (born 1 December 1940) is a Tanzanian sprinter. He competed in the men's 4 × 100 metres relay at the 1972 Summer Olympics.

References

1940 births
Living people
Athletes (track and field) at the 1970 British Commonwealth Games
Athletes (track and field) at the 1972 Summer Olympics
Tanzanian male sprinters
Olympic athletes of Tanzania
Place of birth missing (living people)
Commonwealth Games competitors for Tanzania